is a Japanese UCI Continental cycling team. It was established in 2009 with a home base in Utsunomiya, Tochigi, the location of the Japan Cup cycling race.

Team roster

Major wins
2010
Stage 1 Tour de Kumano, Yoshimitsu Tsuji
2014
Tour de Okinawa, Nariyuki Masuda
2016
Overall Tour de Hokkaido, Nariyuki Masuda
Stage 2, Nariyuki Masuda
Prologue Tour de Kumano, Takayuki Abe
Stage 3 Tour de Kumano, Jin Okubo
Tour de Okinawa, Nariyuki Masuda
2017
U23 Asian Time Trial Cycling Championships, Rei Onodera
Points classification Tour de Kumano, Takayuki Abe
2018
Mountains classification Tour of Japan, Yuzuru Suzuki
Stage 2, Takeaki Amezawa
Prologue Tour de Kumano, Takayuki Abe
2019
Prologue Tour of Japan, Atsushi Oka
 National Time Trial Championships, Nariyuki Masuda
Tour de Okinawa, Nariyuki Masuda
2021 
Overall Tour of Japan, Nariyuki Masuda
Stage 1, Nariyuki Masuda
Mountains classification, Nariyuki Masuda
2022
Young rider classification Tour of Japan, Taishi Miyazaki

References

External links
 

UCI Continental Teams (Asia)
Cycling teams established in 2009
Cycling teams based in Japan